The 2000 Missouri lieutenant gubernatorial election was held on November 7, 2000. Democratic nominee Joe Maxwell defeated Republican nominee Wendell Bailey with 52.14% of the vote. , this was the last time a Democrat was elected Lieutenant Governor of Missouri.

Primary elections
Primary elections were held on August 8, 2000.

Democratic primary

Candidates
Joe Maxwell, State Senator
Gracia Yancey Backer, State Representative
Catherine Powell

Results

Republican primary

Candidates
Wendell Bailey, former State Treasurer of Missouri
Joe Ortwerth, County executive of St. Charles County

Results

General election

Candidates
Major party candidates
Joe Maxwell, Democratic
Wendell Bailey, Republican

Other candidates
Phillip W. Horras, Libertarian
Patricia A. Griffard, Natural Law
George D. Weber, Reform
Ben Kjelshus, Green
Bob Wells, Constitution

Results

References

2000
Missouri
Gubernatorial